Guldager is a surname. Notable people with the surname include:

 Bjarne Guldager (1897–1971), Norwegian sprinter
 Holger Guldager (1904–1986), Danish cyclist
  (born 1966), Danish autobiographer

See also
 Gulager